Neodactria caliginosellus, the corn root webworm or black grass-veneer, is a moth in the family Crambidae. It was described by James Brackenridge Clemens in 1860. It is found in North America, where it has been recorded from Alabama, Alberta, California, Florida, Georgia, Illinois, Indiana, Maine, Maryland, Mississippi, North Carolina, Ohio, Oklahoma, Ontario, South Carolina and Tennessee. The habitat consists of grassy areas and fields.

The wingspan is about 17 mm. The forewings are dark brown to blackish with black postmedian and subterminal lines. The hindwings are dark grayish brown. There is one generation per year with adults on wing in June and July in the northern part of the range. In Florida, adults have been recorded on wing from February to November.

The larvae feed on turf grasses and corn stalks. They have a pale white to gray body.

References

Crambini
Moths described in 1860
Moths of North America